Tinex is a chain of supermarkets in the Republic of North Macedonia.
Tinex was founded in the 1990s, with its first store opening in Skopje.

Supermarkets of North Macedonia
Companies based in Skopje
Retail companies established in 1994